Milo is an unincorporated community in Jefferson Township, Huntington County, Indiana.

History
Milo was never properly laid out or platted. A post office called Milo was established in 1881, and remained in operation until it was discontinued in 1923. Milo M. Sharp was an early postmaster.

Milo was a station and shipping point on the Clover Leaf Railroad.

Geography

References

Unincorporated communities in Huntington County, Indiana
Unincorporated communities in Indiana